Elmer R. Gates (1859–1923), the son of Jacob and Phoebe Goetz, was an American scientist and inventor.

Biography
Elmer R. Gates was born near Dayton, Ohio in 1859. Most of his education took place with private tutors. He married Phebe Edson in 1894, and they had three children.

Gates's inventions include the foam fire extinguisher, an improved electric iron, an aseptic brewing and fermenting process, electric loom mechanisms, diamagnetic and magnetic separators for extracting gold from sand, an incandescent gas mantle furnace, the educational toy "Box and Block," and numerous other mechanical, scientific,  psychological, and educational devices.

At the turn of the 20th century the Elmer Gates Laboratory in Chevy Chase, MD, was the largest private laboratory in the United States.

He died at his home in Washington, D.C. on December 3, 1923.

Psychology
Although a prolific inventor, Gates considered himself to be a psychologist.  He applied scientific experiment to introspection and used invention to examine the processes by which the mind discovers new knowledge.  This study led him to "psychotaxis," the integrated hierarchy of sensory discriminations required to create a valid and complete mental representation of a given part of the physical world.  Psychotaxis is a major component of "psychurgy," Gates's art of mind-using, which he regarded as an improved scientific method.

He conducted many animal experiments to ascertain the effects of refined sensory discriminations on the structure of the brain.  He researched the chemistry and physiology of human emotions.  For two years, four times daily, he kept three series of detailed records to determine the environmental and bodily conditions under which his own mentation was most successful.

The novel nature of his research caught the fancy of the popular press of his day. Misinterpretations and fabrications were common.  Despite Gates's repeated clarifications and denials, the reports took on a life of their own; some persist today.

Gates and his system of generating ideas are mentioned in Napoleon Hill's popular book Think and Grow Rich. A rough description of the process is outlined in the "Genius Is Developed Through The Sixth Sense" section of Chapter 11.

Footnotes

References
 Cattell, J. McK., "'Professors' Garner and Gates" (Letter to the Editor), Science, Vol.3, No.56, (January 24, 1896), p. 134.
 Gates, D.E., Elmer Gates and the Art of Mind-Using, Exposition Press, (New York), 1971. 
 Gates, E., The Relations and Development of the Mind and Brain, Theosophical Society, (New York), 1904.
 Gates, E., "The Science of Mentation and some New General Methods of Psychologic Research", The Monist, Vol.V, No. 4, (1895), pp. 574–597.
 Hill, N., Think and Grow Rich; Teaching, for the First Time, the famous Andrew Carnegie Formula for Money-Making, Based upon the Thirteen Proven Steps to Riches, The Ralston Society, (Meriden), 1937.
 Mills, W., "The Science of Mentation" (Letter to the Editor), Science, Vol.2, No.46, (November 15, 1895), p. 667.

External links
The collected works of Elmer R. Gates
Wikisource: "Elmer Gates Dies After Long Illness" (Obituary Washington Sun, December 4, 1923)

1859 births
1923 deaths
19th-century American inventors
20th-century American inventors
People from Dayton, Ohio